Route 118 is a North/South provincial highway in the Canadian province of New Brunswick. The road runs from Route 126 intersection in Miramichi. The road has a length of approximately 40 kilometres, and services small, otherwise isolated rural communities. In these areas, the highway is often unofficially referred to as "Main  Street."  The road parallels the Miramichi River as well as Route 108 and later Route 8 directly to the North side of the river.  The highway starts in Miramichi as Islandview Drive.  The Highway starts next to Beaubears Island later passing Barnaby Island and lastly Doctors Island.  In Blackville, the Highway changes to Colonial Drive and lastly Campbell Road.

History

Route 118 was commissioned in 1965 to replace the former route 36.

Intersecting routes
 Route 126 in Miramichi
Route 8 in Blackville

River crossings
 Passing Bridge in Nelson Junction
 Barnaby River - Kirkwood
 Passing Bridge in Renous-Quarryville
 Southwest Miramichi River - Blackville

Communities along the Route
Nelson Junction
Kirkwood
Chelmsford
McKinleyville
Doyles Brook
White Rapids
Grays Rapids
Coughlan
Blackville

See also
List of New Brunswick provincial highways

References

118
118
Transport in Miramichi, New Brunswick